The Iceman Cometh is a play written by American playwright Eugene O'Neill in 1939. First published in 1946, the play premiered on Broadway at the Martin Beck Theatre on October 9, 1946, directed by Eddie Dowling, where it ran for 136 performances before closing on March 15, 1947. It has subsequently been adapted for the screen multiple times.
The work tells the story of a number of alcoholic dead-enders who live together in a flop house above a saloon and what happens to them when the most outwardly "successful" of them embraces sobriety and reveals that he has been on the run after murdering his "beloved" wife.

Characters
 Harry Hope: Widowed proprietor of the saloon and rooming house where the play takes place. He has a tendency to give free drinks, though he constantly says otherwise
 Ed Mosher: Hope's brother-in-law (brother of Hope's late wife Bess), a con-man and former circus man
 Pat McGloin: Former police lieutenant who was convicted on criminal charges and kicked off the force
 Willie Oban: Harvard Law School alumnus
 Joe Mott: Former proprietor of a gambling house
 General Piet Wetjoen: Former leader of a Boer commando
 Captain Cecil Lewis: Former Captain of British infantry
 James "Jimmy Tomorrow" Cameron: Former Boer War correspondent who is constantly daydreaming about getting his old job back again tomorrow (hence his nickname)
 Hugo Kalmar: Former editor of anarchist periodicals who often quotes the Old Testament
 Larry Slade: Former syndicalist-anarchist
 Rocky Pioggi: Night bartender, who is paid little and makes his living mostly by allowing Pearl and Margie to stay at the bar in exchange for a substantial cut of the money they make from prostitution, although he despises being called a pimp 
 Don Parritt: Teenage son of a former anarchist
 Pearl: Streetwalker working for Rocky
 Margie: Streetwalker working for Rocky
 Cora: Streetwalker, Chuck's girlfriend
 Chuck Morello: Day bartender, Cora's boyfriend
 Theodore "Hickey" Hickman: Hardware salesman
 Moran: Police detective
 Lieb: Police detective

Plot summary
The Iceman Cometh is set in New York in 1912 in Harry Hope's downmarket Greenwich Village saloon and rooming house. The patrons, twelve men and three prostitutes, are dead-end alcoholics who spend every possible moment seeking oblivion in one another's company and trying to con or wheedle free drinks from Harry and the bartenders. They drift purposelessly from day to day, coming fully alive only during the semi-annual visits of salesman Theodore "Hickey" Hickman. When Hickey finishes a tour of his business territory, which is apparently a wide expanse of the East Coast, he typically turns up at the saloon and starts the party. As the play opens, the regulars are expecting Hickey to arrive in time for Harry's birthday party. The first act introduces the various characters as they bicker among themselves, showing how drunk and delusional they are, all the while awaiting Hickey.

Joe Mott insists that he will soon re-open his casino. The English Cecil "The Captain" Lewis and South African Piet "The General" Wetjoen, who fought each other during the Boer War, are now good friends, and both insist that they'll soon return to their nations of origin. Harry Hope has not left the bar since his wife Bess's death 20 years ago. He promises that he'll walk around the block on his birthday, which is the next day. Pat McGloin says he hopes to be reinstated into the police force, but is waiting for the right moment. Ed Mosher prides himself on his ability to give incorrect change, but he kept too much of his illegitimate profits to himself and was fired; he says he will get his job back someday. Hugo Kalmar is drunk and passed out for most of the play; when he is conscious, he pesters the other patrons to buy him a drink. Chuck Morello says that he will marry Cora tomorrow.  Larry Slade is a former syndicalist-anarchist who looks pityingly on the rest. Don Parritt is a former anarchist who shows up later in the play to talk about his mother (Larry's ex-girlfriend) to Larry; specifically her arrest due to her involvement in the anarchist movement.

When Hickey finally arrives, his behavior throws the characters into turmoil. With as much charisma as ever, he insists that he sees life clearly now as never before because he no longer drinks. Hickey wants the characters to cast away their delusions and accept that their heavy drinking and inaction mean that their hopes will never be fulfilled. He takes on this task with a near-maniacal fervor. How he goes about his mission, how the other characters respond, and their efforts to find out what has wrought this change in him, take over four hours to resolve. During and after Harry's birthday party, most seem to have been somewhat affected by Hickey's ramblings. Larry pretends to be unaffected, but when Don reveals he was the informant responsible for the arrest of his own mother (Larry's former girlfriend), Larry rages at him; Willie decides McGloin's appeal will be his first case, and Rocky admits he is a pimp.

Most of the men Hickey talked with do go out into the world—dressed up, hopeful of turning their lives around—but they fail to make any progress. Eventually, they return and are jolted by a sudden revelation. Hickey, who had earlier told the other characters first that his wife had died and then that she was murdered, admits that he is the one who killed her. The police arrive, apparently called by Hickey himself, to arrest Hickey. Hickey justifies the murder in a dramatic monologue, saying that he did it out of love for her. He relates that his father was a preacher in the backwoods of Indiana. Evidently he was both charismatic and persuasive, and it was his inheriting these traits which led Hickey to become a salesman. An angry kid trapped in a small town, Hickey had no use for anyone but his sweetheart, Evelyn. Evelyn's family forbade her to associate with Hickey, but she ignored them. After Hickey left to become a salesman, he promised he would marry Evelyn as soon as he was able. He became a successful salesman, then sent for her and the two were very happy until Hickey became increasingly guilty following his wife's constant forgiveness of his infidelities and drinking. He then recounts how he murdered her to free her from the pain of his persistent philandering and drinking because she loved him too much to live apart from him. But, in retelling the murder, he laughs and tells Evelyn, "Well, you know what you can do with that pipe dream now, don't you?" In realizing he said this, Hickey breaks down completely. He realizes that he went truly insane and that people need their empty dreams to keep existing. The others agree and decide to testify to his insanity during Hickey's trial despite Hickey's begging them to let him get the death sentence. He no longer wishes to live now that he has no illusions about life.

They return to their empty promises and pipe dreams except for Parritt, who runs to his room and jumps off the fire escape, unable to live with the knowledge of what he has done to his mother after discarding the last of his lies about his action and motivation for it. He first claims that he did it due to patriotism and then for money, but finally admits he did it because he hated his mother, who was so obsessed with her own freedom of action that she became self-centered and alternately ignored or dominated him. Despite witnessing the young man's fatal leap, and acknowledging the futility of his own situation ("by God, there's no hope! I'll never be a success...Life is too much for me!"), Larry fears death as much as life and is consequently left in limbo.

Development 

Emma Goldman, whom O'Neill admired, inspired the play's anarchist subplot.

The Iceman Cometh is often compared to Maxim Gorky's The Lower Depths, which may have been O'Neill's inspiration for his play.

James Barton, in his performance as Hickey, was reportedly not up to the massive emotional and physical demands of such a titanic part, and sometimes forgot his lines or wore out his voice.

Marlon Brando was offered the part of Don Parritt in the original Broadway production, but turned it down. Brando was able to read only a few pages of the script the producers gave him before falling asleep, and he later argued at length with the producers, describing the play "ineptly written and poorly constructed" in the hopes they would explain what the play was about and not discover that he hadn't read it.

Stage productions 
1947: The original production was staged at the Martin Beck Theatre and opened on October 9, 1946, and closed on March 15, 1947, after 136 performances. It was directed by Eddie Dowling with production and lighting design by Robert Edmond Jones. The cast starred James Barton (Theodore "Hickey" Hickman), Jeanne Cagney (Margie), Leo Chalzel (Hugo Kalmar), Russell Collins (James "Jimmy Tomorrow" Cameron), Paul Crabtree (Don Parritt), Dudley Digges (Harry Hope), Ruth Gilbert (Pearl), Charles Hart (Lieb), Nicholas Joy (Cecil "The Captain" Lewis), Marcella Markham (Cora), Joe Marr (Chuck Morello), John Marriott (Joe Mott), E. G. Marshall (Willie Oban), Al McGranary (Pat McGloin), Tom Pedi (Rocky Pioggi), Carl Benton Reid (Larry Slade), Morton L. Stevens (Ed Mosher), Frank Tweddell (Piet "The General" Wetjoen), and Michael Wyler (Moran). The play received mixed reviews.

1956: An Off-Broadway production staged after O'Neill's death featured Jason Robards as Hickey and was directed by José Quintero. This production was an unqualified success and established the play as a great modern tragedy.

1973: A Broadway revival staged at the Circle in the Square Theatre ran from December 13, 1973, to February 16, 1974, with James Earl Jones as Hickey.

1985: A Broadway revival staged at the Lunt-Fontanne Theatre featured Jason Robards as Hickey with a cast that included Barnard Hughes as Harry Hope, Donald Moffat as Larry Slade, and again directed by José Quintero.  It ran from September 29, 1985, to December 1, 1985.

1990: Chicago's Goodman Theatre mounted a production directed by Robert Falls, starring Brian Dennehy as Hickey, Jerome Kilty as Hope and James Cromwell as Slade.

1998: A London production featuring Kevin Spacey had a successful and critically acclaimed run through 1998 and 1999 at the Almeida Theatre and the Old Vic in London.

1999: A Broadway revival from the 1998 London production staged at the Brooks Atkinson Theatre with Kevin Spacey as Hickey. It ran from April 8, 1999, to July 17, 1999.

2012: A revival at Chicago's Goodman Theatre featured Nathan Lane in the lead role of Hickey, Brian Dennehy this time as Larry Slade, and was directed by Robert Falls. It started its run at the Goodman Theatre in April 2012, slated for a six-week engagement. It was a huge success for the Goodman Theater, whose management stated it was the most successful production in its history. This production omitted the character of Pat McGloin.

2015: The Goodman Theatre production directed by Falls, starring Lane and Dennehy and the rest of the original cast with the creative team from Chicago was produced at the Harvey Theater of the Brooklyn Academy of Music with a six-week engagement starting on February 5, 2015, that featured Nathan Lane and John Douglas Thompson. For his performance, Thompson won an Obie Award.

2018: Denzel Washington starred as Hickey and Tammy Blanchard as Cora, in a Broadway revival directed by George C. Wolfe. The production ran for 14 weeks at the Bernard B. Jacobs Theatre, beginning in previews on March 23, 2018, and opening officially on April 26. The cast featured Frank Wood as Cecil Lewis, Bill Irwin as Ed Mosher, Reg Rogers as James Cameron, Colm Meaney as Harry Hope, and David Morse as Larry Slade. The sets were by Santo Loquasto, costumes by Ann Roth, and lighting design by Jules Fisher and Peggy Eisenhauer.

Adaptations

1960: TV Production for Play of the Week on the National Telefilm Associates (NTA) syndication network, directed by Sidney Lumet. This production featured Jason Robards as Hickey, Tom Pedi from the original 1947 stage production as Rocky Pioggi, Sorrell Booke as Hugo Kalmar, and Robert Redford as Don Parritt.  It is presented as two separate episodes of the series due to the length of the work, with a total run time of 210 minutes.  It is notable in view of TV standards of the time that while much dialog was omitted for time, that which was retained was not changed to soften its language.  For example, at the end of Hickey's breakdown, Robards says the words "that damned bitch" exactly as O'Neill had written.

1973: A film adaptation as part of the American Film Theatre directed by John Frankenheimer. This production featured many well known actors including Lee Marvin as Hickey, Fredric March as Harry Hope, Robert Ryan as Larry Slade, Tom Pedi as Rocky Pioggi, Bradford Dillman as Willie Oban, Sorrell Booke as Hugo Kalmar, Martyn Green as Cecil Lewis, Moses Gunn as Joe Mott, George Voskovec as The General (Piet Wetjoen) and Jeff Bridges as Don Parritt.  This film was the final film appearance of Fredric March, Robert Ryan and Martyn Green.  The film run time is 239 minutes. Dialog was consistently trimmed for time as might be done for a stage production. The character of Ed Mosher was excised entirely. There are some variations in words or word order in ordinary speech that differ from the published text. The most important speeches are present and usually performed in full from the published text.  Some segments of dialog are presented in an order that differs from the published text.

The 2013 short video game The Entertainment features numerous references to The Iceman Cometh, including characters named after Evelyn Hickman, Larry Slade, Harry Hope, and Pearl. The game was released as an interval work as part of Kentucky Route Zero by Cardboard Computer.

2020: The Iceman Cometh was broadcast as a two-part Zoom Premiere on YouTube Live as a benefit for the Actors Fund.  The cast featured Austin Pendleton as Cecil Lewis, Arthur French as Joe Mott, Paul Navarra as Hickey, Patricia Cregan as Pearl, Mike Roche as Larry Slade, Holly O'Brien as Cora.  Marygrace Navarra was the stage manager.  The event was produced by Caroline Grace Productions, in association with the 2020 Theatre Company.  The event was a benefit for the Actors Fund during the COVID-19 pandemic of 2020.

Notable performers 
 Jason Robards played the role of Hickey in multiple stage productions and the 1960 TV adaptation.
 Tom Pedi played the role of Rocky the bartender in the original 1947 stage production, the 1960 TV adaptation and the 1973 film adaptation.
 Sorrell Booke played the role of Hugo Kalmar in both the 1960 TV adaptation and the 1973 film adaptation.
 Robert Redford played the role of Don Parritt in the 1960 TV adaptation.
 Jeff Bridges played the role of Don Parritt in the 1973 film adaptation and Lee Marvin played Hickey. 
 Denzel Washington played the role of Hickey in the 2018 stage production.
 Austin Butler played the role of Don Parritt in the 2018 stage production.
 Kevin Spacey played the role of Hickey in the 1999 Broadway and London Old Vic Productions.
 Nathan Lane played the role of Hickey and Brian Dennehy played Larry Slade in the 2012 Goodman Theater production, which was revived in 2015 at BAM.

Awards and nominations

Original Broadway production

1973 Broadway revival

1985 Broadway revival

1999 Broadway revival

2018 Broadway revival

See also
 Raines law

References

Bibliography

Further reading

External links
 
 
 
 

1939 plays
American plays adapted into films
Broadway plays
Drama Desk Award-winning plays
Fiction set in 1912
Literature about alcohol abuse
Off-Broadway plays
Plays by Eugene O'Neill
Plays set in New York City
Plays set in the 1910s
Tragedy plays
Uxoricide in fiction